The Luxembourg Olympic and Sporting Committee, abbreviated to COSL, is the National Olympic Committee for Luxembourg.

List of presidents

See also
Luxembourg at the Olympics

External links
Official website

Committee
National Olympic Committees
Olympic and Sporting Committee
Olympic and Sporting Committee
1912 establishments in Luxembourg
Sports organizations established in 1912